Hamtramck Disneyland is a yard art folk art located in Hamtramck, Michigan begun by a man named Dmytro Szylak. Hamtramck Disneyland was started in 1992 and came to be finished in 1999. It is built on a 30-foot backyard on top of two adjacent garages.  Dmytro was born in Ukraine, and also once lived in Germany. After immigrating to the United States, he worked for General Motors, but soon after his retirement he felt the need to find a hobby. Dmytro began piling together different objects—some old, some new, and some bought, while others were hand crafted. This towering structure stands tall above his house and garage. Over the course of 12 years, Dmytro continued to add different pieces to his work, which eventually grew to be a collage.

History 
The notion of building his artwork began when Dmytro Szylak, a Ukrainian immigrant, retired from General Motors. After working 32 years, Szylak began to search for a hobby, which led to the creative idea of building Hamtramck Disneyland. To utilize his spare time, and with the idea of bringing something new to the city, Szylak began to convert his own backyard into a piece of art. It is a homemade construction built on top of two adjacent garages; a 30-ft. collage filled with pictures of Elvis and other pop stars, year-round Christmas lights, wooden soldiers armed with toy guns, and American flags, among many other things. In 1992, when Szylak started building his work in his backyard, he endured many difficulties. Neighbors and city officials were against Szylak’s idea of constructing artwork in his garage rooftop.  Szylak was later honored by the mayor of Hamtramck and his works have been displayed in many local art shows. In 2006 Bruce Weber shot a photo shoot with Kate Moss for Women’s Wear magazine in the site and around various other places in Detroit.

Dmytro Syzlak died on 1 May 2015 at the age of 92. As of June 2015, the future of the work was uncertain—his estate was still tied up in probate court.

The site went on the market on 3 March 2016 and was bought by a local group, Hatch Art, for $100,000. The houses consist of four apartments—three are rented out to defray costs and the other is for an artist in residence.

Design and theme 

The work is a collaboration of various ordinary objects put together to form a towering structure. The creator of this collage, Dmytro Szylak, used these objects to create his own interpretation of Disneyland. It is decorated with various objects ranging from mechanical fan propellers to plastic horses and a massive handmade jet aircraft. The major theme that seems very much evident throughout the collage is that of a carnival. One will notice that Dmytro has a recurring design throughout the entire structure. He used plastic horses for a carousel. The primary colors he chose to use were yellow, blue and red. These three colors were on many of the structures, which would signify his heritage. Dmytro was a native Ukrainian and he used the yellow and blue colors on his project to show his pride for his home country. He also used yellow and red for some of his propellers, seeing as he once resided in Germany before immigrating to America. Dmytro also used many handcrafted cutouts of men in uniform. The wooden cutouts of men were placed under what seemed to be missiles that were intensely decorated with Christmas lights.  The men also had one eye painted in the middle of their heads.  On the other side of the yard, there stands a windmill which has different cutouts of men and women who appear to be doing manual labor such as cutting a log with a saw and cooking.

Toward the back of the structure, which can be seen through the alley, the structure takes a different turn with more vivid colors and paintings placed next to each other. There are also framed newspapers featuring Dmytro's work, as well as a collage of pictures of him with his artwork. The back of the structure covers both garage tops. From the back the fans and propellers are seen next to each other, giving the structure a flying movement. On the back side there sits a sign saying “Welcome to Art Show”.  It really is an art exhibition; on the back side of the structure there are many more frames, and wooden objects such as the Statue of Liberty and soldiers. Way above all the rest of the objects are a carousel. On that side you can see the distinct connection between his American, Ukrainian, and German heritage.
The collaboration of all these objects was just Dmytro's way of self-expression through a form of art. Dmytro said everything he made with this “Disneyland” was unplanned, and it fell together on its own. He had no set plan and no blueprint of how it should look; he began from the ground up.

Visiting the site 
The exhibition is located in an alley between Klinger and Sobieski Streets, south of Carpenter Avenue, in Hamtramck, Michigan.

References
 

Hamtramck, Michigan
Buildings and structures in Wayne County, Michigan
Roadside attractions in Michigan
Tourist attractions in Wayne County, Michigan
American folk art
Art in Michigan
1990s establishments in Michigan